Ayda Aksel (born 31 October 1962) is a Turkish actress.

She studied theatre at Mimar Sinan University. While studying at primary school, she learned ballet and cello at conservatory. Aside from her career as an actress, Aksel voiced various commercials. She worked for the Turkish State Theatres for 15 years. She also briefly joined the Sadri Alışık Theatre.

Theatre 
 Angel on My Shoulder : Stephan Levi - Istanbul State Theatre - 2007
 Yarım Bardak Su : Tarık Ginersel - Istanbul State Theatre - 2004
 Dead Guilty : Richard Harris - Istanbul State Theatre - 2002
 Private Lives : Noël Coward - Istanbul State Theatre - 2000
 Karşı Penceredeki Kadın : Yavuz Özkan - Sadri Alışık Theatre - 1998
 Ben Anadolu : Güngör Dilmen - Istanbul State Theatre - 1997
 No Exit : Jean-Paul Sartre - Istanbul State Theatre - 1993
 Seven Females : Barbara Schottenfeld - Istanbul State Theatre - 1992
 The Tempest : William Shakespeare - Istanbul State Theatre - 1991
 The Idiot : Fyodor Dostoevsky\Simon Gray - Istanbul State Theatre - 1990
 Yangın Yerinde Orkideler : Memet Baydur - Istanbul State Theatre - 1989
 Tohum ve Toprak : Orhan Asena - Istanbul State Theatre - 1986
 Rhinoceros : Eugène Ionesco - Istanbul State Theatre - 1986
 Macbeth : William Shakespeare - Istanbul State Theatre - 1986
 Ah Şu Gençler : Turgut Özakman - Istanbul State Theatre - 1985
 The Good Doctor : Neil Simon - Istanbul State Theatre - 1984
 Düşüş : Nahid Sırrı Örik\Kemal Bekir - Istanbul State Theatre - 1984
 İstanbul Efendisi : Musahipzade Celal - Istanbul State Theatre - 1983
 Yoklar Dağındaki Kar : Mümtaz Zeki Taşkın - Istanbul State Theatre - 1981
 The Trojan War Will Not Take Place : Jean Giraudoux - Istanbul State Theatre - 1980

Filmography

Film
 Mucize 2: Aşk - 2019
 Hayat Öpücüğü - 2015
 Mandıra Filozofu - 2014
 Aşk Kırmızı - 2013
 Behzat Ç. Seni Kalbime Gömdüm - 2011
 Bir Avuç Deniz - 2011
 Aşk Tesadüfleri Sever - 2011
 Kars Öyküleri - 2010
 Sınav - 2006
 Halk Düşmanı - 2004
 Kaçıklık Diploması - 1998
 Cumhuriyet - 1998
 Bir Erkeğin Anatomisi - 1996

TV series
 Baba - 2022  (Fazilet Saruhanlı)
 Hercai - 2019–2021 (Azize Aslanbey-Ayşe Şadoğlu) 
 Gülperi - 2018 (Ayten)
 Dudullu Postası - 2018
 Tutsak - 2017
 Poyraz Karayel 2016–2017
 Kördüğüm - 2016
 Zengin Kız Fakir Oğlan - 2012–2015 (Serpil)
 Yalancı Bahar - 2011
 Gönülçelen - 2010–2011
 Esir Kalpler - 2006
 Hatırla Sevgili - 2006
 Adı Aşk Olsun - 2004
 Kıvılcım - 1999
 Kurtuluş - 1994
 Yıldızlar Gece Büyür - 1991
 Yaprak Dökümü - 1988
 Üç İstanbul - 1983

Awards 
 16th Sadri Alışık Awards : Best Supporting Actress - Aşk Tesadüfleri Sever
 Afife Theatre Awards : Best Actress in a Musical or Comedy - Angel on My Shoulder - 2007
 Lions Theatre Awards : Most Successful Actress - Angel on My Shoulder - 2007
 Istanbul Technical University Awards : Most Successful Actress - Angel on My Shoulder - 2007
 İsmet Küntay Awards : Best Actress - Yarım Bardak Su - 2004
 Afife Theatre Awards : Best Actress - Dead Guilty - 2003
 11th Ankara Film Festival : Best Actress - Kaçıklık Diploması - 1999
 10th Orhan Arıburnu Awards : Best Actress - Kaçıklık Diploması - 1999

References

External links 
 
 

1962 births
Turkish film actresses
Turkish stage actresses
Turkish television actresses
Actresses from Istanbul
Living people